John Marshall (1755–1835) was Chief Justice of the United States.

John Marshall or John Marshal may also refer to:

Entertainment 
 John Marshall (filmmaker) (1932–2005), American anthropologist and documentary filmmaker
 John Marshall (drummer) (born 1941), British jazz-rock drummer
 John C. Marshall (musician) (1941–2012), British jazz and blues guitarist
 John Marshall (musician) (born 1954), American percussionist
 John Marshall (cartoonist) (born 1955), American comic strip artist
 John Marshall (guitarist), guitarist for rock band Metal Church

Law
 John George Marshall (1786–1880), lawyer, judge, and political figure in Nova Scotia, Canada
 John Marshall, Lord Curriehill (1794–1868), British judge
 John Augustine Marshall (1854–1941), U.S. federal judge
 John Marshall Harlan (1833–1911), U.S. Supreme Court justice
 John Marshall Harlan II (1899–1971), U.S. Supreme Court justice

Military
 John Marshall (Royal Navy officer, born 1748) (1748–1819), British explorer, namesake of the Marshall Islands
 John Marshall (Royal Navy officer, born 1785) (1785–1850), British Royal Navy officer
 John Marshall (biographer) (c. 1784–1837), officer in the British Royal Navy and author
 John Houlton Marshall (1768–1837), Nova Scotia naval commander

Politics 
 John Marshal (Marshal of England) (1105–1165), minor Anglo-Norman nobleman during the reign of King Stephen
 John Marshall (MP for Cambridge), MP for Cambridge, 1388–90
 John Marshall (MP for Totnes), MP for Totnes, 1395
 John Marshall (MP for New Romney), MP for New Romney, 1535–39
 John Marshall (MP for Leeds, died 1836) (1797–1836), English politician, Member of Parliament for Leeds
 John Marshall (industrialist) (1765–1845), British businessman and politician
 John Marshall (Conservative politician) (born 1940), British MEP, 1979–89, and MP, 1987–97
 John Joseph Marshall (1807–1870), merchant and politician in Nova Scotia, Canada
 John I. Marshall (1899–1976), politician in Nova Scotia, Canada
 John Marshall (Kentucky politician) (1856–1922), Lieutenant governor of Kentucky
 John W. Marshall (born 1958), Virginia Secretary of Public Safety, 2002–2010
 John Marshall (Kansas judge), Justice of the Kansas Supreme Court from 1915 to 1931

Religion
John Marshall (bishop) (died 1496), Bishop of Llandaff
John Marshall (priest) (1534–1597), English Roman Catholic priest
John Aloysius Marshall (1928–1994), American prelate of the Roman Catholic Church

Science
John Marshall (archaeologist) (1876–1958), Director-General of the Archaeological Survey of India, 1902–1928
John Marshall (surgeon) (1818–1891), English surgeon and teacher of anatomy
John C. Marshall (neuropsychologist) (1939–2007), British experimental psychologist
John Marshall (eye laser scientist) (born 1943), British professor of ophthalmology
John Marshall (oceanographer), American oceanographer
John R. Marshall, physician and pioneer in fertility treatment
J. Stewart Marshall (1911–1992), Canadian physicist and meteorologist

Sports

Cricket
John Marshall (cricketer, born 1796) (1796–1876), Australian cricketer
John Marshall (cricketer, born 1816) (1816–1861), English cricketer
John Marshall (cricketer, born 1837) (1837–1879), English clergyman and cricketer
John Marshall (cricket writer)

Football and rugby
John D. Marshall (American football) (1930–2008), American football and tennis coach, college athletics administrator
John Marshall (American football) (born 1945), NFL assistant coach
John Marshall (footballer, born 1964), English footballer
John Marshall (Third Lanark footballer), Scottish footballer
John Marshall (rugby union) (1929–2012), Scotland rugby union player

Other sports
John Marshall (swimmer) (1930–1957), Australian swimmer
John Marshall (sailor) (born 1942), representative of United States at the 1972 Summer Olympics
John Marshall (jockey) (c.1958–2018), Australian jockey
John Marshall (athlete) (born 1963), American middle-distance track athlete
John Marshall (bowls), Scottish lawn bowler

Others 
 John Marshall (publisher) (1756–1824), London publisher who specialized in children's literature
 John Marshall (Newcastle publisher and printer)
 John Marshall (author) (1845–1915), British classicist and rector of the Royal High School, Edinburgh
 John Marshall (died 1928) (1860–1928), British antiquities art collector
 John Marshall (architect) (1864–1949), American architect
 John Marshall (Scottish sculptor) (1888–1952)
 John Marshall (American sculptor) (1932–2009), American sculptor
 John Marshall (railway historian) (1922–2008), English railway historian
 John Marshall (historian), British historian at Johns Hopkins University
 John Marshall (entrepreneur), American entrepreneur and inventor
 John P. Marshall (born 1978), British businessman
 John Sedberry Marshall (1898–1979), American scholar
 John T. Marshall, collector of vintage toys

See also
Chief Justice John Marshall, an 1883 sculpture in Washington, D.C.
John Marshall Park, a park in Washington, D.C.
John Marshall Law School (disambiguation)
Jack Marshall (disambiguation)
Jonathan Marshall (disambiguation)